The One That Got Away is the sixth and last full-length album by Thin White Rope. The double CD is a recording of the band's last show and was recorded live on 28 June 1992, at Democrazy in Gent, Belgium. It comprises the entire show, except for "The Ruby Sea" and "Moonhead", which were released as a 7" vinyl single (Frontier 46787), and Thing, which has never been released in any format to date.

Track listing
All songs written by Guy Kyser unless otherwise stated.

CD1
Down in the Desert (Becker/Kyser) - 3:45
Disney Girl - 4:55
Eleven - 2:22
Not Your Fault - 4:24
Wire Animals - 3:46
Take It Home - 5:51
Mister Limpet (Kyser/Von Feldt) - 4:03
Elsie Crashed the Party - 3:53
Red Sun -5:12
Some Velvet Morning (Hazlewood) - 5:01
Triangle Song (Kunkel/Kyser) - 5:18
Yoo Doo Right (Can) - 6:59

CD2
Tina and Glen - 2:21
Napkin Song - 1:26
Ants Are Cavemen - 5:50
Fish Song - 5:02
Bartender's Rag - 4:06
Hunter's Moon - 5:45
Astronomy - 4:34 
Outlaw Blues (Dylan) - 2:43
It's OK - 7:52
Wreck of the Ol' 97 - 2:32
Road Runner (Bo Diddley) - 4:17
Munich Eunich - 4:31
Silver Machine (Dave Brock/Robert Calvert) - 4:22
The Clown Song - 1:19

References

1993 live albums
Thin White Rope albums
Frontier Records albums